Jiří Novák was the defending champion, but did not participate.

Wesley Moodie won the title, defeating Mario Ančić in the final 1–6, 7–6(9–7), 6–4.

Seeds
All seeds receive a bye into the second round.

Draw

Finals

Top half

Section 1

Section 2

Bottom half

Section 3

Section 4

References
Draw
Qualifying Draw

2005 Japan Open Tennis Championships